Neodasyscypha is a genus of fungi belonging to the family Hyaloscyphaceae.

The species of this genus are found in Europe, Northern America and Australia.

Species:
 Neodasyscypha cerina 
 Neodasyscypha subciboria

References

Fungi